Arcticalymene is a genus of trilobites found in Silurian-aged marine strata of Arctic Canada and Central Victoria, Australia.  The Canadian species are named after each of the Sex Pistols: A. cooki (Paul Cook), A. jonesi (Steve Jones), A. matlocki (Glen Matlock), A. rotteni (Johnny Rotten) and A. viciousi (Sid Vicious), all named by Adrain and Edgecombe in 1997.

See also
List of organisms named after famous people (born 1950–present)

References

Calymenidae
Fossil taxa described in 1997
Sex Pistols
Fossils of British Columbia
Paleozoic life of the Northwest Territories